Pavel Petrovich Blonsky (Russian: Павел Петрович Блонский; May 26 [O.S. May 14], 1884 – February 15, 1941) was a Russian Soviet psychologist and philosopher who lived in the Ukraine until 1918. Blonsky was one of the main theorists of Soviet paedology and introduced the behaviorist approach in Russian psychology (under the label "objective Marxist psychology"). After the publication of the anti-paedology decree "On Paedological Distortions in the System of People’s Commissariat of Education"  (1936) he was severely criticized for his adherence to psychological testing and studies of inborn capabilities (which contradicted the official Soviet ideology of "inborn equality of all people").

Life and work

Blonsky's search for a new psychology began with the condemnation of philosophical idealism that he - the specialist in Plato and neo-Platonism - now considered to be clearly irreconcilable with "normal common sense".

Published works 
 Задачи и методы народной школы (1916)
 Философия Плотина (1918)
 Проблема реальности у Беркли. Киев, 1907.
 Блонский П. П. Проблема реальности у Беркли. М.: Книжный дом «ЛИБРОКОМ», 2009. — 160 с. (Из наследия мировой философской мысли: история философии.)
 Современная философия, т. 1-2 (1918—1922)
 Трудовая школа (1919)
 Реформа науки (1920)
 Очерк научной психологии (1921)
 Психологические очерки (1927)
 Очерки детской сексуальности (1928)
 Педология (1934)
 Память и мышление (1935, переиздана в 2001)
 К проблеме воспоминания. М., Директмедиа Паблишинг, 2008.
 Развитие мышления школьника (1935)
 Избранные педагогические произведения, — М., 1961;
 Избранные психологические произведения. — М., 1964;
 Избранные педагогические и психологические сочинения. Т. 1-2. — М., 1979.
 Психологический анализ припоминания М., Директмедиа Паблишинг, 2008.

References

Ukrainian psychologists
Soviet psychologists
1884 births
1941 deaths
Imperial Moscow University alumni